Lahowal Assembly constituency is one of the 126 assembly constituencies of Assam Legislative Assembly. Lahowal forms part of the Dibrugarh Lok Sabha constituency.

Members of Legislative Assembly 
 1957: Lily Sengupta, Indian National Congress
 1962: Lily Sengupta, Indian National Congress
 1967: Lily Sengupta, Indian National Congress
 1972: Dipak Moormoo, Indian National Congress
 1978: Dipak Moormoo, Indian National Congress
 1983: Dipak Moormoo, Indian National Congress
 1985: Dipen Tanti, Independent
 1991: Haren Bhumij, Indian National Congress
 1996: Prithibi Majhi, Indian National Congress
 2001: Prithibi Majhi, Indian National Congress
 2006: Prithibi Majhi, Indian National Congress
 2011: Prithibi Majhi, Indian National Congress
 2016: Rituparna Baruah, Bharatiya Janata Party
 2021: Binod Hazarika, Bharatiya Janata Party

Election results

2016 result

References

External links 
 

Assembly constituencies of Assam